Xue Li may refer to:

Xue Li (薛禮; died 195), Chinese military officer serving under the Eastern Han dynasty warlord Liu Yao
Xue Rengui (614–683), formal name Xue Li, Chinese general during the early Tang dynasty

See also
Li Xue (born 1985), Chinese born French table tennis player